Gordon Harry Bahr (May 19, 1914 – May 5, 1991) was an American football coach. He served as the head football coach at the University of Wisconsin–La Crosse in 1945.

References

External links
 

1914 births
1991 deaths
Wisconsin–La Crosse Eagles football coaches
People from Sheboygan, Wisconsin
Players of American football from Wisconsin